Igor Magogin (born September 16, 1981) is a Russian professional ice hockey centre who is currently playing for HC 07 Detva of the Slovak Extraliga. Magogin joined Severstal Cherepovets as a free agent on a one-year contract on May 3, 2016, after spending one season with HC Lada Togliatti.

References

External links

1981 births
Living people
Avtomobilist Yekaterinburg players
HC 07 Detva players
HC Lada Togliatti players
Rubin Tyumen players
Severstal Cherepovets players
Sputnik Nizhny Tagil players
HC Yugra players
Russian ice hockey centres
Russian expatriate sportspeople in Slovakia
Expatriate ice hockey players in Slovakia
Russian expatriate ice hockey people